The Vancouver Sun Classic Children's Book Collection is a set of 32 novels published by The Vancouver Sun from 2004-2005. The novels could only be purchased by presenting a coupon from the newspaper and paying the stated amount of money to a store which sold the novel. The first novel, The Jungle Book, was offered for free when its coupon was presented. The series was intended to be read by children to increase interest in reading.

The novels in the series are listed here:

Lists of novels
Children's novels
Culture of Vancouver